Henry Hartness was an English professional football forward and half back who scored on his only appearance in the Scottish League for Heart of Midlothian.

Career statistics

References 

Year of birth missing
Year of death missing
Footballers from Newcastle upon Tyne
English footballers
Association football forwards
Sunderland A.F.C. players
Heart of Midlothian F.C. players
Scotswood F.C. players
Croydon Common F.C. players
Scottish Football League players
Southern Football League players